

Track listing
 "Shark Attack" (Tim Finn)
 "Poor Boy" (Tim Finn)
 "Hermit McDermitt" (Tim Finn)
 "Years Go By" (Neil Finn/Eddie Rayner)
 "Split Ends" (Phil Judd/Tim Finn)
 "Message to My Girl" (Neil Finn)
 "Best Friend" (Tim Finn/Neil Finn)
 "What's the Matter with You" (Neil Finn)
 "I See Red" (Tim Finn)
 "Time for a Change" (Phil Judd)
 "Strait Old Line" (Neil Finn)
 "Charlie" (Tim Finn)
 "History Never Repeats" (Neil Finn)

US version (1995)
 "Shark Attack" (Tim Finn)
 "Poor Boy" (Tim Finn)
 "Hermit McDermitt" (Tim Finn)
 "Years Go By" (Neil Finn/Eddie Rayner)
 "Split Ends" (Phil Judd/Tim Finn)
 "Message to My Girl" (Neil Finn)
 "Best Friend" (Tim Finn/Neil Finn)
 "Six Months in a Leaky Boat" (Tim Finn/Split Enz)
 "What's the Matter with You" (Neil Finn)
 "Dirty Creature" (Tim Finn/Nigel Griggs/Neil Finn)
 "I See Red" (Tim Finn)
 "Time for a Change" (Phil Judd)
 "Strait Old Line" (Neil Finn)
 "Charlie" (Tim Finn)
 "History Never Repeats" (Neil Finn)
 "Hard Act to Follow" (Tim Finn)

References

1994 live albums
Split Enz live albums
Mushroom Records live albums